Steve Fatupua-Lecaill (January 12, 1976 –  September 27, 2003) was a Tahitian footballer.
He has played for AS Vénus and Tahiti national football team.

On September 27, 2003, he committed suicide at the age of 27 by hanging himself jumping from a footbridge in Mahina in due to emotional problems regarding his wife about infidelity.

External links
 

1976 births
2003 deaths
2003 suicides
Association football defenders
French Polynesian footballers
Tahiti international footballers
1998 OFC Nations Cup players
2000 OFC Nations Cup players
2002 OFC Nations Cup players
Suicides by hanging in France
Suicides in French Polynesia